Following are lists of conflicts in the Americas:
 List of conflicts in Central America
 List of conflicts in North America
 List of conflicts in South America

Americas-related lists
Americas
Americas